The Greece–Bosnia and Herzegovina Friendship Building (Зграда пријатељства између Грчке и Босне и Херцеговине) is a government office building in Sarajevo, Bosnia and Herzegovina. The building houses the Council of Ministers of Bosnia and Herzegovina. It is often erroneously referred to as the Parliament building because of its close proximity to the actual 5-story parliament building which is adjacent to the Greek–Bosnian Friendship building.

History
The building was completed in 1974 during the Yugoslav period, and occupied by the government of the Socialist Republic of Bosnia and Herzegovina. It was originally named the Executive Council Building (Zgrada Izvršnog Vijeća). It served as the principal government building in Bosnia and Herzegovina until it was extensively damaged by Serb shelling in May 1992 in the first few weeks of the Siege of Sarajevo, which was part of the Bosnian War. After the end of the war, the building was gutted and remained vacant until reconstruction began in 2006.

Reconstruction
In 2006, the government of Greece provided 80.4% of the funding for the reconstruction of the building. The total cost of the project was €17,057,316. Reconstruction was completed by the Greek company DOMOTECHNIKI SA in just over one year, and the building was inaugurated on 23 July 2007 by the Prime Minister of Greece Kostas Karamanlis and the collective presidents of Bosnia.

Gallery

References

External links

Building of Friendship between Greece & Bosnia and Herzegovina

Skyscraper office buildings in Bosnia and Herzegovina
Centar, Sarajevo
Office buildings in Bosnia and Herzegovina
Parliamentary Assembly of Bosnia and Herzegovina
Buildings and structures completed in 1974
Architecture in Bosnia and Herzegovina
Bosnia and Herzegovina–Greece relations